North Notts College (previously North Nottinghamshire College) is a further education college in Worksop in the county of Nottinghamshire in England. It has 1300 full-time and 8,000 part-time students and 500 employees.

References

External links
 North Nottinghamshire College website

Further education colleges in Nottinghamshire
Worksop